Gregory Fernard Hutchison (born August 4, 1967), known as Big Hutch and Cold 187um, is an American rapper and producer, and leader of the rap group Above the Law. He currently records for his self-founded label.

Biography 
Hutchison is the son of songwriter Richard Hutchison and the nephew of late R&B singer Willie Hutch. Above the Law signed to Ruthless Records in late 1989, releasing their debut album, Livin' Like Hustlers, in 1990. The album was overseen and co-produced by producer Dr. Dre, who would soon leave the label and start up Death Row Records, and featured members of the group N.W.A. Cold 187um contributed to the success of Ruthless after Dre's departure and the breakup of N.W.A. During his tenure on the label he produced for Eazy-E's 5150: Home 4 tha Sick and It's On (Dr. Dre) 187um Killa, MC Ren's The Villain in Black among other projects.

Hutch and his group parted ways with Ruthless in 1996. In mid-1999, the producer was brought in by Suge Knight to replace Daz Dillinger as head producer for Death Row Records. During his tenure there, Cold 187 um would oversee production on numerous albums. In 2004, Above the Law was put on hold, as Cold 187 um was jailed for drug trafficking. Upon his release the group resumed recording and touring. As a solo artist, Hutch released Fresh Out the Pen in August 2008, and both EF U Hutch in November 2010, and Only God Can Judge Me in April 2011, in collaboration with Big Shot Music Group.

In 2011, as Big Hutch, Hutchinson toured with Insane Clown Posse, Twiztid and Blaze Ya Dead Homie as part of the American Psychos Tour in October. Hutchinson was a featured artist on "Where Do We Go From Here?", which was recorded during that tour. Later in the year, it was announced that Hutchinson had signed with Psychopathic Records, and his album The Only Solution was released on October 22, 2012. Hutchinson left Psychopathic in 2013 due to poor sales.

On April 1, 2014, Hutchinson released his self-produced new album titled The Big Hit. Shortly after the release of "The Big Hit" Cali Barnes released "Remember Me", produced by Cold 187um, but the single failed to chart. In August 2015, Cold 187um was featured on Dr. Dre's album Compton on the track "Loose Cannons". On October 24, 2015, The Hip Hop Foundation released an article on their website titled "5 Legendary Hip Hop Producers You Never Hear About" giving Cold 187um the number one spot. The article credits him for being a legend that pioneered a generation of west coast hip hop sound G-Funk.

In 2016, Netflix Originals released Hip-Hop Evolution. Hutchison appears in episode four: "The Birth of Gangsta Rap". On October 10, 2016, Cold 187 um released The Black Godfather, a double album featuring numerous guest artists.

Discography

Studio albums 
 Executive Decisions (1999)
 Live from the Ghetto (2004)
 Fresh Out the Pen (2008)
 Only God Can Judge Me (2011)
 The Only Solution (2012)
 The Big Hit (2014)
 The Black Godfather (2016)
 The Resurection of Gangster Rap (2021)

Mixtapes 
 From Pomona with Love (2011)

Extended plays 
 EF U Hutch (2010)

Production credits

References

External links 
 Cold 187um interview
 Big Shot Music Group

1967 births
Living people
21st-century American rappers
African-American rappers
American hip hop record producers
Gangsta rappers
G-funk artists
People from Pomona, California
Psychopathic Records artists
Record producers from California
Ruthless Records artists
21st-century African-American musicians
20th-century African-American people